The Nutrition Journal is a peer-reviewed medical journal covering nutrition science. It was established in 2002 and is published by BioMed Central, an imprint of Springer Science+Business Media. Its editor-in-chief is Nehme Gabriel (Central Florida Health Alliance). According to the Journal Citation Reports, the journal has a 2014 impact factor of 2.60.

References

External links

Nutrition and dietetics journals
BioMed Central academic journals
Publications established in 2002
English-language journals